Business Up Front/Party in the Back is the debut album by Christian alternative group Family Force 5, released on March 21, 2006. It has been notable for putting Family Force 5 into the mainstream. "Love Addict" was a Christian radio hit. A "diamond edition" was released on March 20, 2007 with three additional tracks.

Track listing

Diamond edition

Credits 
 Solomon "Soul Glow Activatur" Olds – vocals, guitar, programming, synthesizers
 Jacob "Crouton" Olds – drums, vocals
 Joshua "Fatty" Olds – bass guitar, vocals
 Nathan "Nadaddy" Currin – DJ
 Brad "20 Cent" Allen – guitars (on tracks 1–7, 9–12)
 Derek "Chap Stique" Mount – guitars on track 8 (replaced Allen)
 Produced by Joe Baldridge and Solomon Olds, except "Put Ur Hands Up", "Earthquake", and "Lose Urself" (Olds, Butch Walker)
 Mixed by Chris Lord-Alge
 Mastered by Leon Zervos
 Recorded at Bridge Street Studio and FM2 (Franklin, TN), and The Rental House Studios and Ruby Red Productions (Atlanta, GA)

Notes 
 "Kountry Gentleman", "Replace Me", and "Love Addict" were the first singles off the record; in fact, a video for "Kountry Gentleman" was actually released in the summer of 2005, about nine months before the full-length album was released. No video was made for "Replace Me"; the song was sent only to Christian radio. A video was released for "Love Addict" in mid-2006.
 Advance copies of the album did not include "Replace Me"; the song "Earthquake" was instead followed by "Lose Urself", "Peachy", "Supersonic", "Numb", and "Colour of Water", which did not make it onto the final record. Solomon Olds explained that the band's record labels (Maverick and Gotee) only wanted twelve songs for the album and the band thought "Replace Me" was a better song than "Colour of Water".
 "Kountry Gentleman" was featured in the trailer for the kung-fu film "The Warrior's Way."
 "Love Addict" was released as downloadable content for the music game Rock Band 2."
 "Love Addict" is on the Digital Praise PC game Guitar Praise.

Awards 
In 2007, the album was nominated for a Dove Award for Rock Album of the Year at the 38th GMA Dove Awards.

Charts

References 

2006 debut albums
2007 albums
Gotee Records albums
Family Force 5 albums
Maverick Records albums